Nicolet was a federal electoral district in Quebec, Canada, that was represented in the House of Commons of Canada from 1867 to 1935.

It was created by the British North America Act, 1867 which preserved existing electoral districts in Lower Canada. It consisted of the County of Nicolet. From 1903 to 1924, it included the parishes of Ste. Brigitte, Ste. Eulalie, Ste. Perpétue and St. Samuel. It was abolished in 1933 when it was redistributed into Lotbinière and Nicolet—Yamaska ridings.

Members of Parliament

This riding elected the following Members of Parliament:

Election results

By-election: On Mr. Gaudet being appointed to the Legislative Council of Quebec, for Kennebec Division, 31 October 1877

By-election: On Mr. Méthot being appointed to the Legislative Council of Quebec, for La Vallière Division, 27 March 1884

 
|Nationalist Conservative
|Athanase Gaudet ||align=right|1,535 

By-election: On Mr. Gaudet's death, 29 April 1888

By-election: On Mr. Boisvert's death, 12 November 1897

By-election: On Mr. Lemieux being elected to sit for Gaspé, 3 December 1906

By-election: On Mr. Devlin's resignation, 29 October 1907

By-election: On Mr. Trahan's acceptance of an office of emolument under the Crown, 25-04-1923

See also 

 List of Canadian federal electoral districts
 Past Canadian electoral districts

References

External links 
 Riding history from the Library of Parliament

Former federal electoral districts of Quebec